Muri Abbey is a Benedictine monastery dedicated to Saint Martin of Tours. It flourished for over eight centuries at Muri, in the Canton of Aargau, near Zürich, Switzerland. It is currently established as Muri-Gries in South Tyrol and was formerly a part of the Austrian-Hungarian Empire.

History
The monastery of Saint Martin of Tours at Muri in the Canton of Aargau, in the Diocese of Basel (but originally in that of Constance), was founded in 1027 by Radbot, Count of Habsburg, one of the progenitors of the House of Habsburg. Rha, a daughter of Frederick, Duke of Lower Lorraine, and Werner, Bishop of Strasburg, each donated a portion of land to a monastery which they established there. A colony of monks was drawn from the nearby Einsiedeln Abbey, under the leadership of Prior Reginbold. On his death in 1055, Burchard was chosen as the monastery's first abbot. During his rule the abbey church was consecrated in 1064.

About this time, the community was reinforced by the accession of a new colony of monks from the Abbey of St. Blaise in the Black Forest, one of whom, the Blessed Luitfrid, continued the government of both communities until his death 31 December 1096. The monastery pursued its quiet work of religion and civilization under the leadership of able abbots, the most remarkable of whom were 
Ranzelin
Cuno, founder of a school and a generous benefactor to the library of the monastery
Henry Scheuk who greatly increased its landed property
Henry de Schoenwerd

Under Schoenwerd's rule, a whole family embraced the religious life. The father with his sons entered the abbey of the monks, whilst his wife and daughters betook themselves to the adjoining convent of nuns, a community which later on was transferred to Hermetschwil, around five miles distant from Muri. The good reputation enjoyed by the Abbey of Muri procured it many friends. In 1114, Emperor Henry V took it under his special protection; and the popes on their side were not less solicitous for its welfare. The abbey had extensive possessions or sharhoder rights in Unterwalden, in Stans, Buochs, and shielings in the mountains around Engelberg.

The abbey had its vicissitudes of good and bad fortune. It was laid low by two disastrous fires, in 1300 and in 1363; wars and uprisings checked for a time its prosperity. It recovered something of its old life under Abbot Conrad II, only to suffer again during the abbacy of his successor, George Russinger, in the war between the Swiss Confederacy and the Habsburgs.

Russinger, who had taken part in the Council of Constance (1414-1418), set out to reform the abbey and joined it to the newly formed Congregation of Bursfelde, a union of Benedictine monasteries, both of men and of women, founded in 1446 to promote the reform of Benedictine practice. Pope Julius II (1503–1513) granted the Abbots of Muri the use of pontificalia.

In the 1530s, the abbey was attacked by troops from Bern, a leading - and newly Protestant - member of the Swiss Confederacy. It survived thanks to Abbot Laurentius von Heidegg (1508–1540), who was friends with Heinrich Bullinger, the leading reformer of Zürich.

The rule of Abbot Jakob Meyer, a member of a noble family from Lucerne, proved an economic disaster. Meyer was eventually forced out of office in 1596 and replaced by John Jodoc Singisen, who proved himself a second founder of his monastery, who extended his care to the other Benedictine houses of Switzerland and was one of the founders of the Swiss Congregation established in 1602. Largely through his efforts discipline was restored; monks of piety and letters went forth from Muri to re-people the half-full cloisters; by his wisdom suitable constitutions were drawn up for such communities of nuns as had survived so many revolutions. His successor, Dom Dominic Tschudi, was a man of like mould, and a scholar whose works were held in great repute. He was born at Baden in 1595 and died there in 1654. His Origo et genealogia comitum de Habsburg is his best known work.

With the eighteenth century fresh honours came to Muri. The Emperor Leopold I raised Abbot Placid Zurlauben, and his successor, to the rank of princes of the Holy Roman Empire, and spent a vast sum of money in rebuilding and embellishing the monastery and church, the ancient mausoleum of the imperial family. The abbey continued to prosper in every way; good discipline was kept up and many distinguished ecclesiastics and learned men were educated within its walls.

With the spread of the French Revolution, the Canton of Aargau set out to drive out religious institutions. Muri, after a long resistance, was obliged to submit. Its abbot, an old man, had withdrawn to the monastery of Engelberg, more favourably situated, and there died on 5 November 1838, leaving his successor, D. Adalbert Regli, to deal with the situation after the canton closed the abbey in 1841. Despite their expulsion from Muri, the community never wholly disbanded; the abbot and some of the monks found a welcome in the Canton of Unterwalden, which invited them to undertake the management of the cantonal college at Sarnen. There the main body of the monks resided, until the Austrian Emperor, Ferdinand I, offered them a residence at Gries near Bozen in Tyrol, in an old priory of Canons Regular of the Lateran which had been unoccupied since 1807. The Holy See concurred in the grant, and confirmed the transfer of the community of Muri to Gries by a Brief of Gregory XVI, dated 16 September 1844. In order to avoid complications the house of Gries was continued in its former status as a priory and incorporated with the Swiss Abbey of Muri, which is regarded as temporarily located in its Austrian dependency, the Abbot of Muri being at the same time Prior of Gries.

The abbey of Muri had been a favoured burial place of the House of Habsburg. In the 20th century, the hearts of the last reigning Imperial couple, Emperor Charles I of Austria (now the Blessed Charles of Austria, 1887–1922) and Empress Zita of Bourbon-Parma (1892–1989) are in the family crypt in the Loreto Chapel, as are the bodies of their sons Rudolf and Felix.

Gallery

See also  
 Bolzano

References

External links

Klosterkirche Muri

Burial sites of the House of Habsburg
Benedictine monasteries in Switzerland
Monasteries in South Tyrol
Imperial abbeys
1027 establishments in Europe
Christian monasteries established in the 11th century
Buildings and structures in Aargau
Churches in Aargau
Charles I of Austria